The 2018 FedEx Cup Playoffs, the series of four golf tournaments that determined the season champion on the U.S.-based PGA Tour, was played from August 23 to September 23. It included the following four events:
The Northern Trust – Ridgewood Country Club, Paramus, New Jersey
Dell Technologies Championship – TPC Boston, Norton, Massachusetts
BMW Championship – Aronimink Golf Club, Newtown Square, Pennsylvania
Tour Championship – East Lake Golf Club, Atlanta, Georgia

These were the 12th FedEx Cup playoffs since their inception in 2007.

The point distributions can be seen here.

Regular season rankings

The Northern Trust
The Northern Trust was played August 23–26. Of the 125 players eligible to play in the event, five did not enter: Rickie Fowler (ranked 17), Rory McIlroy (21), Henrik Stenson (50), Patrick Rodgers (93), and Bud Cauley (122). Brandt Snedeker (30) was a late withdrawal, reducing the field to 119. 80 made the second-round cut at 142 (E).

Bryson DeChambeau won by four strokes over Tony Finau. The top 100 players in the points standings advanced to the Dell Technologies Championship. This included six players who were outside the top 100 prior to The Northern Trust: Nick Watney (ranked 102nd to 67th), Danny Lee (103 to 98), Scott Stallings (107 to 94), Bronson Burgoon (111 to 73), Brian Stuard (118 to 99) and Jhonattan Vegas (123 to 87). Six players started the tournament within the top 100 but ended the tournament outside the top 100, ending their playoff chances: Patrick Rodgers (ranked 93rd to 104th), Brandon Harkins (94 to 103), Trey Mullinax (95 to 102), Charl Schwartzel (96 to 105), Rory Sabbatini (97 to 109), and Alex Čejka (99 to 108).

Par 71 course

Dell Technologies Championship
The Dell Technologies Championship was played August 31 – September 3. Of the 100 players eligible to play in the event, two did not: Francesco Molinari (ranked 13) and Rickie Fowler (22). 77 players made the second-round cut at 144 (+2).

Bryson DeChambeau won his second straight playoff event, winning by two strokes over Justin Rose. The top 70 players in the points standings advanced to the BMW Championship. This included six players who were outside the top 70 prior to Dell Technologies Championship: Pan Cheng-tsung (ranked 72nd to 33rd), Tyrrell Hatton (71 to 54), Abraham Ancer (92 to 56), Brice Garnett (81 to 63), Peter Uihlein (83 to 64), and Keith Mitchell (78 to 66). Six players started the tournament within the top 70 but ended the tournament outside the top 70, ending their playoff chances: Ryan Moore (ranked 60th to 71st), Kim Meen-whee (61 to 72), Stewart Cink (65 to 73), Nick Watney (67 to 74), Jimmy Walker (68 to 75), and Kevin Streelman (70 to 77).

Par 71 course

BMW Championship
The BMW Championship was played September 6–10. Of the 70 players eligible to play in the event, only Daniel Berger (ranked 65) did not play. There was no cut. Due to weather conditions, the fourth round was delayed until September 10.

Keegan Bradley won on the first hole of a sudden-death playoff with Justin Rose. The top 30 players in the points standings advanced to the Tour Championship. This included two players who were outside the top 30 prior to the BMW Championship: Bradley (ranked 52 to 6) and Xander Schauffele (41 to 18). Two players started the tournament within the top 30 but ended the tournament outside the top 30, ending their playoff chances: Jordan Spieth (27 to 31) and Emiliano Grillo (29 to 32).

Par 70 course

Reset points
The points were reset after the BMW Championship.

Tour Championship
The Tour Championship was played September 20–23. All 30 golfers that qualified for the tournament played, and there was no cut. Tiger Woods won by two strokes over Billy Horschel, to finish second in the FedEx Cup rankings. Justin Rose finished tied for fourth place and took the FedEx Cup, 41 points ahead of Woods. He became the first player to win the FedEx Cup without winning any of the four events in the FedEx Cup Playoffs. Bryson DeChambeau, who led the rankings before the event, finished in 19th place and dropped to third place in the final rankings.

Par 70 course

Final leaderboard

For the full list, see here.

Table of qualifying players
Table key:

* First-time Playoffs participant

References

External links
Coverage on the PGA Tour's official site

FedEx Cup
PGA Tour
PGA Tour events
FedEx Cup Playoffs
FedEx Cup Playoffs
FedEx Cup Playoffs